Šveicarija is a village in Jonava district municipality, in Kaunas County, in central Lithuania. According to the 2011 census, the village has a population of 812 people. The village's name means "Switzerland" in Lithuanian.

The village has a primary school, a library, a post office (ZIP code: 55041), a chapel, a sports center, a kindergarten, and a culture center.

References 

Villages in Jonava District Municipality